Sony Max 2  is an Indian pay television channel owned by Culver Max Entertainment and launched in 2014. It is the second Indian channel launched by Sony which is focused solely on old Hindi-language movie broadcasts, being the sister channel of Sony Max.

References

External links
 Official Website

Television stations in Mumbai
Movie channels in India
Television channels and stations established in 2014
Sony Pictures Entertainment
Bollywood-based movie channels
Sony Pictures Networks India
Hindi-language television channels in India
Television networks in India